Beautiful Pleasure (March 31, 1995 – August 11, 2011) was an American Thoroughbred Champion racehorse who won the 1999 Breeders' Cup Distaff and was voted that year's American Champion Older Female Horse.

Bred in Florida by Farnsworth Farms, winner of the 1996 Eclipse Award for Outstanding Breeder, Beautiful Pleasure was sired by multiple stakes winner Maudlin, a son of 1975 Kentucky Derby winner and U.S. Racing Hall of Fame inductee, Foolish Pleasure. She was and out of the mare Beautiful Bid, a daughter of Baldkski who was a son of the 1970 English Triple Crown winner, Nijinsky.  She was a full sister to the speedy Mecke, a multiple Grade 1 stakes winner in track/course record times on both dirt and turf racing surfaces.

Beautiful Peasure was sold to John Oxley for $480,000 by Farnsworth Farms through the April 1997 Keeneland sale for  two-year-olds in training.

Racing career
Trained by John Ward Jr., she was a winner of six Grade I races at age two, four, and five, three of which came during her 1999, Championship season.

Broodmare
When her racing career was over, Beautiful Pleasure served as a broodmare for owner John Oxley's Fawn Leap Farm near Midway, Kentucky. The most successful of her foals to race was Dr. Pleasure, sired by the 1995 Kentucky Derby and Belmont Stakes winner, Thunder Gulch.

Suffering from chronic laminitis, Beautiful Pleasure was humanely euthanized on August 11, 2011.

References

1995 racehorse births
2011 racehorse deaths
Racehorses bred in Florida
Racehorses trained in the United States
Eclipse Award winners
Thoroughbred family 19-b
Breeders' Cup Distaff winners